Viktor Andriyovych Pylypenko (born 30 April 2000) is a Ukrainian professional footballer who plays as a centre-back for Kremin Kremenchuk on loan from Vorskla Poltava.

References

External links
 
 
 

2000 births
Living people
People from Kremenchuk
Ukrainian footballers
Association football defenders
FC Vorskla Poltava players
FC Kremin Kremenchuk players
FC Peremoha Dnipro players
FC Sumy players
Ukrainian First League players
Ukrainian Second League players
Ukrainian Amateur Football Championship players
Sportspeople from Poltava Oblast